JWH-030 is a research chemical which is a cannabinoid receptor agonist. It has analgesic effects and is used in scientific research. It is a partial agonist at CB1 receptors, with a Ki of 87 nM, making it roughly half the potency of THC. It was discovered and named after John W. Huffman.

In the United States, CB1 receptor agonists of the 3-(1-naphthoyl)pyrrole class such as JWH-030 are Schedule I Controlled Substances.

See also 
 JWH-147

References 

JWH cannabinoids
Naphthoylpyrroles
CB1 receptor agonists